

See also

Tango music

Tango
Tango music